ECSD may refer to:

 Edmonton Catholic School District in Alberta, Canada
 Elko County School District, Nevada, United States
 Eureka County School District, Nevada, United States
 Escambia County School District in Florida, United States
 Emmetsburg Community School District in Iowa, United States